Leroux (mostly northwestern France), LeRoux (American spelling), Le Roux (mostly Brittany, as a translation of Breton Ar Rouz or Ar Ruz) or Roux (mostly southeastern France, as a translation of Occitan Ros) is a surname of French origin meaning "red-haired" or "red-skinned" and may also come in certain cases (e.g. with the spelling Le Roux) from Breton Ar Roue meaning ″The King″. It may refer to:


People
 Adélaïde Leroux (born 1982), French actress
 AJ le Roux (born 1990), South African rugby player
 Alain Le Roux (c. 1040–1093), associate of William I of England
 Antoine Leroux (fl. 1846–1853), New Mexico mountain man
 Auguste Leroux (1871–1954), French painter
 Bernard Le Roux (born 1989), South African-born French rugby player
 Bruno Le Roux (born 1965), French politician
 Buddy LeRoux (1930–2008), American businessman and baseball club owner
Charles C.-J. Le Roux (born 1724), French educator, inventor, and physicist
 Charles Le Roux (1814–1895), French painter
 Charles Leroux (1856–1889), American balloonist and parachutist
 Chelazon Leroux, Indigenous Canadian drag queen
 Chris Leroux (born 1984), Canadian baseball pitcher
 Christine Barkhuizen le Roux (1959–2020), South African writer
 Claudine Le Roux (born 1964), French canoer
 Christophe Le Roux (born 1969), French footballer
 Daniel Le Roux (born 1933), South African footballer
 Doppies le Roux (born 1985), South African rugby player
 Etienne Leroux (1922–1989), South African writer
 François Le Roux (born 1955), French baritone
 François Leroux (born 1970), Canadian ice hockey player
 Fred le Roux (1882–1963), South African cricketer
 Garth Le Roux (born 1955), South African cricketer
 Gaspard Le Roux (1660–1707), French harpsichordist
 Gaston Leroux (1868–1927), French journalist, detective, and novelist
 Gaston Leroux (ice hockey) (1913–1988), Canadian ice hockey player
 Gaston Leroux (politician) (born 1948), Canadian politician
 Grant le Roux (born 1986), South African rugby player
 Hennie le Roux (born 1967), South African rugby player
 Isabel Le Roux (born 1987), South African sprinter 
 Jean Leroux (born 1949), Canadian politician
 Jean-Marie Le Roux (1863–1949), French mathematician
 Jean Paul Leroux, Venezuelan actor
 Jean-Yves Leroux (born 1976), Canadian ice hockey player
 Josephine Leroux (1747–1794), French Ursuline nun
 Lash LeRoux (born 1976), American wrestler
 Laurent Leroux (1759–1855), Canadian businessman and politician
 Le Roux Smith Le Roux (1914–1963), South African artist, actor and broadcaster
 Louis Héctor Leroux (1829–1900), French painter 
 Louis Napoleon Le Roux (1890–1944), Breton nationalist 
 Maurice Le Roux (1923–1992), French composer and conductor
 Maxime Leroux (1951–2010), French actor
 Ollie le Roux (born 1973), South African rugby player
 Paul Le Roux (born 1972), Rhodesia-born programmer, criminal cartel boss and DEA informant
 P. K. Le Roux (1904–1985), South African politician
 Pierre Leroux (1797–1871), French philosopher and political economist
 Pierre Leroux (author) (born 1958), Canadian novelist, journalist and screenwriter
 Pieter Louis Le Roux (1865–1943), South African missionary
 Robert Leroux (sociologist) (born 1964), Canadian sociologist
 Robert Leroux (born 1967), French fencer
 Roland Leroux (born 1956), German chemist
 Roulland Le Roux (fl. 1508–1527), French architect
 Shaun Le Roux (born 1986), South African squash player
 Sydney Leroux (born 1990), Canadian-American soccer player
 Willie le Roux (born 1989), South African rugby player
 Xavier Leroux (1863–1919), French composer
 Yvon Le Roux (born 1960), French football player

Fictional characters
Françoise Leroux, aka “Femme Leroux”, character of Le Labyrinthe du monde (Memoirs) by Marguerite Yourcenar
Leroux, in Night Flight by Antoine de Saint-Exupéry
Leroux, in L’Armée des ombres (Army of Shadows) by Joseph Kessel
Louis Leroux, from the fifth season of the video game series Criminal Case
Messieurs Leroux, characters of Arsène Lupin contre Herlock Sholmès by Maurice Leblanc
Pierre Leroux, from the novel A French Lover by Taslima Nasrin
 Zommari Leroux, villain from the manga Bleach

References

See also 
 Marie-Élisabeth Laville-Leroux (1770–1826), French painter

French-language surnames
Surnames of Breton origin
Afrikaans-language surnames